Basil Spaulding Millspaugh (July 24, 1878 – October 10, 1960), known as Basil Ruysdael, was an American actor and opera singer.

Early life
Born in Jersey City, New Jersey, as Basil Spaulding Millspaugh, Ruysdael was the son of Dr and Mrs Charles Millspaugh. He graduated from Waverly High School and attended Cornell University from 1898–99 as a special student in mechanical engineering and sang with the Cornell University Glee Club. He sang secondary roles in the German repertoire at the Metropolitan Opera in New York as a bass-baritone from 1910 to 1918, appearing with such popular opera stars as Leo Slezak and Geraldine Farrar.

Stage career
Early in his career, Ruysdael appeared on the New York stage. His Broadway credits include Enchanted Isle (1927), The Cocoanuts (1925), Topsy and Eva (1924), and Robin Hood (1912).

Film career

Ruysdael was also a prolific character actor in films. He is probably best known to modern audiences as Detective Hennessy in the first Marx Brothers film The Cocoanuts (1929), a role he created in the stage play. He also appeared in Pinky, The File on Thelma Jordon, Colorado Territory,  Broken Arrow, People Will Talk, Carrie, The Violent Men, Blackboard Jungle, The Last Hurrah  and The Horse Soldiers.

In 1955, Ruysdael played General Andrew Jackson in miniseries Davy Crockett. Ruysdael was cast as Joseph in "The Policeman's Gun", a 1958 episode of Official Detective. In his final television role he appeared on Perry Mason as Henry W. Dameron in the 1959 episode, "The Case of Paul Drake's Dilemma". His last on-screen role was in The Story of Ruth in 1960.

Radio career
Ruysdael narrated the NBC Blue Network series Stones of History which was broadcast in 1934 and 1935. He was the announcer on a syndicated programme for Rexall in 1939 before becoming the commercial spokesman for DuPont on Cavalcade of America on the NBC Blue Network in 1940. By 1941, he was a pitch-man for Lucky Strike cigarettes, which sponsored several shows including Your Hit Parade, Information Please and The Jack Benny Show. He appeared, transcribed, on the latter show from October 1, 1944 to November 28, 1948 and gave his name near the end of the final commercial. Ruysdael was also the announcer on a 1944 summer replacement show, Mother and Dad, starring Parker Fennelly on CBS, and The Radio Reader's Digest in 1946 on CBS.

Voice teacher
Ruysdael moved to California in 1923 to teach voice. His most famous pupil was baritone Lawrence Tibbett.

Death
Ruysdael died on October 10, 1960, at the age of 82, of complications following surgery in a hospital in Hollywood, California. He was survived by his widow, Kathleen, who was his third wife. He was buried in Forest Lawn Memorial Park, Omaha, Nebraska.

Partial filmography

The Cocoanuts (1929) – Hennessy
Colorado Territory (1949) – Dave Rickard
Come to the Stable (1949) – The Bishop
Task Force (1949) – Admiral at Annapolis (uncredited)
Pinky (1949) – Judge Walker
The Doctor and the Girl (1949) – Dr. Francis I. Garard
The File on Thelma Jordon (1950) – Judge Jonathan David Hancock
One Way Street (1950) – Father Moreno
Broken Arrow (1950) – Gen. Oliver Howard
High Lonesome (1950) – 'Horse' Davis, Ranch Owner
Gambling House (1951) – Judge Ravinek
The Scarf (1951) – Cyrus Barrington
Raton Pass (1951) – Pierre Challon
My Forbidden Past (1951) – Dean Cazzley
Half Angel (1951) – Dr. Jackson
People Will Talk (1951) – Dean Lyman Brockwell
Boots Malone (1952) – Preacher Cole
Carrie (1952) – Mr. Fitzgerald
Prince Valiant (1954) – Old Viking (uncredited)
The Shanghai Story (1954) – Rev. Hollingsworth
Davy Crockett, King of the Wild Frontier (1955) – Gen. / President Andrew Jackson (archive footage)
The Violent Men (1955) – Tex Hinkleman
Blackboard Jungle (1955) – Prof. A.R. Kraal
Pearl of the South Pacific (1955) – Tuan Michael
Diane (1956) – Chamberlain
Jubal (1956) – Shem Hoktor
These Wilder Years (1956) – Judge
Official Detective "The Policeman's Gun" (1958) – Joseph
The Last Hurrah (1958) – Bishop Gardner
The Horse Soldiers (1959) – Commandant
The Story of Ruth (1960) – Shammah (final film role)

References

External links

 
 

1878 births
1960 deaths
20th-century American male actors
20th-century American male singers
20th-century American singers
American male film actors
American male radio actors
American operatic bass-baritones
Classical musicians from New Jersey
Classical musicians from New York (state)
Cornell University alumni
Male actors from Jersey City, New Jersey
Musicians from Jersey City, New Jersey
Singers from New Jersey
Voice teachers